In the Face of Demolition (危樓春曉) is a 1953 Hong Kong drama film directed by Lee Tit and starring Bruce Lee, Cheung Ying, Ng Cho-fan and Tsi Law-lin. The film was ranked number 18 of the Best 100 Chinese Motion Pictures presented at the 24th Hong Kong Film Awards.

Plot
This film is about a crumbling apartment complex and its residents. Lo Ming (Cheung Ying) is an unemployed teacher and he is forced to take a job as a rent collector.

Cast 
 Bruce Lee as Wah (華仔) 
 Mui Yee - Fong 
 Cheung Ying as Lo Ming (羅明) 
 Ng Cho-fan as Leung Wai (梁威) 
 Tsi Law-lin as Pak Ying (白瑩)
 Lo Duen as Wong Tai-pan (黃大班) 
 Kong Duen-yee as Yuk-fong (玉芳)
 Gao Luquan as Drunken Immortal (醉八仙) 
 Lee Yuet-ching as Third Aunt (三姑) 
 Law Lan as Nurse 
 Fung Ying-seung as Suave gangster
 Chow Chi-sing as Rent collector
 Lai Cheuk-Cheuk as Mrs. Wong (黃師奶)
 Wong Cho-san as Second Uncle Tam (譚二叔)
 Wong Man-lei as Tam's wife 
 Chow Nin-wa as Servant
 Yip Ping as Wai's wife
 Lam Mui-mui as Ling-chi (玲子)
 Mok Hung as Head of dance hostesses
 Ho Siu-hung as Fourth Uncle (四叔)
 Ho Pik-kin as So Chi-sing (蘇子誠)
 Kam Lo as Nurse
 To Sam-Ku as Seventh Aunt (七姑)

See also
Bruce Lee filmography

References

External links
 Wei lou chun xiao at imdb.com
 In the Face of Demolition at hkcinemagic.com
 In the Face of Demolition at hkmdb.com
 In the Face of Demolition at filmaffinity.com
 In the Face of Demolition at senscritique.com

1953 films
1953 drama films
Hong Kong drama films
Hong Kong black-and-white films
1950s Cantonese-language films
Films shot in Hong Kong
Films about poverty